Radek Šelicha (born 12 September 1975) is a retired Czech football midfielder.

References

1975 births
Living people
Czech footballers
FK Chmel Blšany players
FK Teplice players
FK Ústí nad Labem players
FC Viktoria Plzeň players
SK Kladno players
ZFC Meuselwitz players
Association football midfielders
Czech First League players
Czech expatriate footballers
Expatriate footballers in Germany
Czech expatriate sportspeople in Germany
People from Mělník
Sportspeople from the Central Bohemian Region